Hkusam Mountain is a mountain on the northeast coast of Vancouver Island, British Columbia, Canada, located  southeast of Sayward and  northeast of Victoria Peak.

See also
 Geography of British Columbia

References

Vancouver Island Ranges
One-thousanders of British Columbia